The 1923 Prime Minister Honours were announced on 8 February 1923, the list of political appointments was recommended by the Prime Minister Bonar Law. The list was not issued as part of the 1923 New Year Honours as it was delayed to allow scrutiny by a Privy Council committee following a recommendation of a Royal Commission on Honours. It was sometimes known as the "Short Honours List".

Viscount
 Sir George Younger, Bt., Chairman of the Unionist Party Organisation since 1 January 1917.

Baron
 Rt Hon Herbert Pike Pease MP for Darlington and Assistant Postmaster-General 1915-1922.
 Sir Owen Philipps GCMG who was an MP from 1906-1922.

Privy Councillor
 John Frederick Peel Rawlinson KC, MP for Cambridge University since 1906.

Baronets
 Lieutenant-Colonel Sir James Philip Reynolds, DSO, TD, JP for public and political services in Lancashire.
 Colonel Charles Rosdew Burn, MP for Torquay since 1919.
 Lieutenant-Colonel Sir Frederick Hall, KBE, DSO, MP for Dulwich since 1910.
 Joseph Henry Kaye for public and political services in Huddersfield.

Knight Grand Cross of the Order of the British Empire (GBE)
 Sir John Malcolm Fraser, Bt., Honorary Principal Agent for the Unionist Party.

Knight Bachelor
 Alfred Appleby, JP for public and political services in Newcastle upon Tyne.
 Commander Walter George Windham, for public and political services.
 George Wigley, for public and political services in Nottingham.
 George Duncan Grey, LLD, for public and political services in Weston-super-Mare.
 Ernest Gardner, MP from 1901 to 1922.

References

1923 in the United Kingdom
1923 awards
British honours system